Sarah Price may refer to:

 Sarah Price (swimmer) (born 1979), English backstroke swimmer
 Sarah Price (filmmaker), American filmmaker
 Sarah Price (author), Christian fiction novelist
 Sarah Frances Price (1849–1903), American botanist
 Sally Price (chemist) (Sarah Lois Price), professor of physical chemistry

See also
 Sara Price (born 1992), American driver